Kemol Savory (born 27 September 1996) is a Guyanese cricketer. He made his List A debut on 7 November 2019, for Guyana in the 2019–20 Regional Super50 tournament.

References

External links
 

1996 births
Living people
Guyanese cricketers
Guyana cricketers
Place of birth missing (living people)